Jahanabad-e Pain (also Romanized as Jahānābād-e Pā’īn; also known as Jahānābād) is a village in Fahraj Rural District, in the Central District of Fahraj County, Kerman Province, Iran. At the 2006 census, its population was 705, in 148 families.

References 

Populated places in Fahraj County